Otto Schindler (11 August 1925 – 6 March 2009) was an Austrian sprint canoeist who competed in the late 1950s. At the 1956 Summer Olympics in Melbourne, he finished sixth in the C-2 1000 m and  eighth in the C-2 10000 m event.

References
Otto Schindler's profile at Sports Reference.com

1925 births
2009 deaths
Austrian male canoeists
Canoeists at the 1956 Summer Olympics
Olympic canoeists of Austria